List of Orthodox Archbishops of Tsilkani of the Georgian Orthodox and Apostolic Church:
 Zosime (present)

Georgian Orthodox Church
Tsilkani